Brendan Clarke is a Grand Prix motorcycle racer from Australia.

Career statistics

By season

References

External links
 Profile on motogp.com

Motorcycle racers from Brisbane
Living people
1984 births
500cc World Championship riders
Supersport World Championship riders